Halak, Khalak, Al-Halak or Khulak may refer to:

Villages in Iran 
Halak Dar Khadarham
Darvish Khalak
Khulak
Siah Khulak

People
 Jaroslav Halák (born 1985), Slovak professional ice hockey goaltender
Muhanad Al-Halak (born 1989), German-Iraqi politician

See also
Hulak
Khalaf (disambiguation)